A trademark (also written trade mark or trade-mark) is a type of intellectual property consisting of a recognizable sign, design, or expression that identifies products or services from a particular source and distinguishes them from others. The trademark owner can be an individual, business organization, or any legal entity. A trademark may be located on a package, a label, a voucher, or on the product itself. Trademarks used to identify services are sometimes called service marks.

The first legislative act concerning trademarks was passed in 1266 under the reign of Henry III of England requiring all bakers to use a distinctive mark for the bread they sold. The first modern trademark laws emerged in the late 19th century. In France, the first comprehensive trademark system in the world was passed into law in 1857. The Trade Marks Act 1938 of the United Kingdom changed the system, permitting registration based on "intent-to-use", creating an examination based process, and creating an application publication system. The 1938 Act, which served as a model for similar legislation elsewhere, contained other novel concepts such as "associated trademarks", a consent to use the system, a defensive mark system, and a non claiming right system.

Usage
A trademark identifies the brand owner of a particular product or service. Trademarks can be used by others under licensing agreements; for example, Bullyland obtained a license to produce Smurf figurines; the Lego Group purchased a license from Lucasfilm to be allowed to launch Lego Star Wars; TT Toys Toys is a manufacturer of licensed ride-on replica cars for children. The unauthorized usage of trademarks by producing and trading counterfeit consumer goods is known as brand piracy.

The owner of a trademark may pursue legal action against trademark infringement. Most countries require formal trademark registration as a precondition for pursuing this type of action. The United States, Canada, and other countries also recognize common law trademark rights, which means action can be taken to protect any unregistered trademark if it is in use. Still, common law trademarks offer to the holder, in general, less legal protection than registered trademarks.

As the purpose of the trademark is to identify a particular source of the product, rather than the product itself, it is widespread legal advice that trademark owners should always use their trademarks as adjectives modifying a generic product name, and set off with capitalization or a distinctive typeface, as a guard against the trademark becoming the generic name of the product. Thus "LEGO bricks" rather than "some Lego" or "Legos". The name of the producer itself is a "trade name" rather than a trademark and can be used as a noun.

Designation and symbols
A trademark may be designated by the following symbols:

 (the "trademark symbol", which is the letters "TM"  in superscript, for an unregistered trademark, a mark used to promote or brand goods)
 (which is the letters "SM" in superscript, for an unregistered service mark, a mark used to promote or brand services)
 (the letter "R" surrounded by a circle, for a registered trademark)

The three symbols associated with trademarks represent the status of a mark and accordingly its level of protection. While  can be used with any common law usage of a mark,  may only be used by the owner of a mark following registration with the relevant national authority, such as the U.S. Patent and Trademark Office (USPTO or PTO) or Indian Patent Office (IPO). The proper manner to display either symbol is immediately following the mark in superscript style.

Styles
A trademark is typically a name, word, phrase, logo, symbol, design, image, or a combination of these elements. There is also a range of non-conventional trademarks comprising marks which do not fall into these standard categories, such as those based on colour, smell, or sound (like jingles). Trademarks that are considered offensive are often rejected according to a nation's trademark law.

The term trademark is also used informally to refer to any distinguishing attribute by which an individual is readily identified, such as the well-known characteristics of celebrities. When a trademark is used about services rather than products, it may sometimes be called a service mark, particularly in the United States.

Fundamental concepts
The essential function of a trademark is to exclusively identify the source or origin of products or services, so a trademark, properly called, indicates the source or serves as a badge of origin. In other words, trademarks serve to identify a particular entity as the source of goods or services. The use of a trademark in this way is known as trademark use. Certain exclusive rights attach to a registered mark.

Trademarks are used not only by businesses but also by noncommercial organizations and religions to protect their identity and goodwill associated with their name.

Trademark rights generally arise out of the use of, or to maintain exclusive rights over, that sign about certain products or services, assuming there are no other trademark objections.

Different goods and services have been classified by the International (Nice) Classification of Goods and Services into 45 Trademark Classes (1 to 34 cover goods, and 35 to 45 cover services). The idea behind this system is to specify and limit the extension of the intellectual property right by determining which goods or services are covered by the mark, and to unify classification systems around the world.

History
In trademark treatises it is usually reported that blacksmiths who made swords in the Roman Empire are thought of as being the first users of trademarks. Other notable trademarks that have been used for a long time include Stella Artois, which claims use of its mark since 1366, and Löwenbräu, which claims use of its lion mark since 1383. The first trademark legislation was passed by the Parliament of England under the reign of King Henry III in 1266, which required all bakers to use a distinctive mark for the bread they sold.

The first modern trademark laws emerged in the late 19th century. In France, the first comprehensive trademark system in the world was passed into law in 1857 with the "Manufacture and Goods Mark Act". In Britain, the Merchandise Marks Act 1862 made it a criminal offense to imitate another's trade mark 'with intent to defraud or to enable another to defraud'. In 1875, the Trade Marks Registration Act was passed which allowed formal registration of trademarks at the UK Patent Office for the first time. Registration was considered to comprise prima facie evidence of ownership of a trademark and registration of marks began on 1 January 1876. The 1875 Act defined a registrable trade mark as a device or mark, or name of an individual or firm printed in some particular and distinctive manner; or a written signature or copy of a written signature of an individual or firm; or a distinctive label or ticket'.

In the United States, Congress first attempted to establish a federal trademark regime in 1870. This statute purported to be an exercise of Congress' Copyright Clause powers. However, the Supreme Court struck down the 1870 statute in the Trade-Mark Cases later on in the decade. In 1881, Congress passed a new trademark act, this time according to its Commerce Clause powers. Congress revised the Trademark Act in 1905. The Lanham Act of 1946 updated the law and has served, with several amendments, as the primary federal law on trademarks.

The Trade Marks Act 1938 in the United Kingdom set up the first registration system based on the "intent-to-use" principle. The Act also established an application publishing procedure and expanded the rights of the trademark holder to include the barring of trademark use even in cases where confusion remained unlikely. This Act served as a model for similar legislation elsewhere.

Oldest registered trademarks

The oldest registered trademark has various claimants, enumerated below: 
Australia: Most significant companies were already using trademarks in the mid-nineteenth century and while Australia based its patent law on the British law system, the then province of South Australia (1863), and colonies Queensland and Tasmania (1864), New South Wales (1895) Victoria (1876) and Western Australia (in 1885) had enacted laws to protect trademarks well before Britain did. Thus the Bank of New South Wales had registered its coat of arms in c.1850 and firms such as Tasmanian Jam and Preserved Fruit Co. had a trademark in 1878, when, after the Federation of Australia, the Commonwealth Trademarks Register was introduced on 2 July 1906 and the Trade Marks Office opened in Melbourne, on which date more than 750 applications were lodged. A product for treatment for coughs colds and bronchitis, PEPS, 'a wonderful breathing medicine in soluble tablet form', was the first of these federal trademarks, registered by Charles Edward Fulford; a rounded rectangle designed for the top of a tin. The shape contained the word 'PEPs' along with a descriptive blurb that read 'for coughs, colds & bronchitis.'
United Kingdom: 1876 – The Bass Brewery's label incorporating its triangle logo for ale was the first trademark to be registered under the Trade Mark Registration Act 1875.
 United States: there are at least two claims:
 A design mark with an eagle and a ribbon and the words "Economical, Beautiful, and Durable" was the first registered trademark, filed by the Averill Chemical Paint Company on 30 August 1870 under the Trademark Act of 1870.  However, in the Trade-Mark Cases, the U.S. Supreme Court held the 1870 Act to be unconstitutional.
 The oldest U.S. registered trademark still in use is trademark reg. no 11210, a depiction of the Biblical figure Samson wrestling a lion, registered in the United States on 27 May 1884 by the J.P. Tolman Company (now Samson Rope Technologies, Inc.), a rope-making company.
 Germany: 1875 – The Krupp steel company registered three seamless train wheel tires, which are put on top of each other, as its label in 1875, under the German Trade Mark Protection Law of 1874. The seamless train wheel tire did not break, unlike iron tires with seams, and was patented by Krupp in Prussia in 1853.

Terminology

Terms such as "mark", "brand" and "logo" are sometimes used interchangeably with "trademark". "Trademark", however, also includes any device, brand, label, name, signature, word, letter, numerical, shape of goods, packaging, color or combination of colors, smell, sound, movement or any combination thereof which is capable of distinguishing goods and services of one business from those of others. It must be capable of graphical representation and must be applied to goods or services for which it is registered.

Specialized types of trademark include certification marks, collective trademarks and defensive trademarks. A trademark that is popularly used to describe a product or service (rather than to distinguish the product or services from those of third parties) is sometimes known as a genericized trademark. If such a mark becomes synonymous with that product or service to the extent that the trademark owner can no longer enforce its proprietary rights, the mark becomes generic.

A "trademark look" is an informal term for a characteristic look for a performer or character of some sort. It is usually not legally trademark protected and the term is not used in the trademark law.

Registration
Some law considers a trademark to be a form of property. Proprietary rights about a trademark may be established through actual use of that trademark in the marketplace or through registration of the mark with the relevant trademarks office (or "trademarks registry") of a particular jurisdiction. In some jurisdictions, trademark rights can be established through either or both means. Certain jurisdictions generally do not recognize trademarks rights arising merely through use. If trademark owners do not hold registrations for their marks in such jurisdictions, the extent to which they will be able to enforce their rights through trademark infringement proceedings may be limited. In cases of dispute, this disparity of rights is often referred to as "first to file" (i.e., register) as opposed to "first to use." Some countries, such as Germany, offer a limited number of common law rights for unregistered marks, where to gain protection the goods or services must first occupy a highly significant position in the marketplace — where this could be 40% or more market share for sales in the particular class of goods or services.

In the United States, the registration process includes several steps. First, the trademark owner applies with the United States Patent and Trade Mark Office to register the trademark. About three months after it is filed, the application is reviewed by an examining attorney at the U.S. Patent and Trademark Office. The examining attorney checks for compliance with the rules of the Trademark Manual of Examination Procedure. This review includes procedural matters such as making sure the applicant's goods or services are identified properly. It also includes more substantive matters such as making sure the applicant's mark is not merely descriptive or likely to confuse with a pre-existing applied-for or registered mark. If the application runs afoul of any requirement, the examining attorney will issue an office action requiring the applicant to address certain issues or refusals before registration of the mark. If the examining attorney approves the application, it will be "published for opposition." During this 30-day period, third parties who may be affected by the registration of the trademark may step forward to file an opposition proceeding to stop the registration of the mark. If an opposition proceeding is filed it institutes a case before the Trademark Trial and Appeal Board to determine both the validity of the grounds for the opposition as well as the ability of the applicant to register the mark at issue. Finally, provided that no third-party opposes the registration of the mark during the opposition period or the opposition is ultimately decided in the applicant's favor, the mark will be registered in due course.

Outside of the United States, the registration process is substantially similar to that found in the U.S. save for one notable exception in many countries: registration occurs before the opposition proceeding. In short, once an application is reviewed by an examiner and found to be entitled to registration a registration certificate is issued subject to the mark being open to opposition. The overall length of the trademark registration process varies considerably between individual jurisdictions, from 2 to 24 months.

A registered trademark confers a bundle of exclusive rights upon the registered owner, including the right to exclusive use of the mark about the products or services for which it is registered. The law in most jurisdictions also allows the owner of a registered trademark to prevent unauthorized use of the mark about products or services which are identical or "colorfully similar" to existing registered products or services, and in certain cases, prevent the use of entirely dissimilar ones. The test is always whether a consumer of the goods or services will be confused as to the identity of the source or origin, not just the area of rights specified by the trademark. An example might be a very large multinational electronics brand such as Sony Corporation where a non-electronic product such as a pair of sunglasses might be assumed by a consumer to have come from Sony Corporation of Japan despite being outside a class of goods to which Sony has rights, yet still protected by Sony's trademark; a similarly named psychotherapy office or line of hamburger buns or summer camps, however, would not be infringing on Sony Corporation's trademark because the service or products being offered are so vastly different from Sony Corporation's trademark claim of rights and range of manufactured goods.

Once trademark rights are established in a particular jurisdiction, these rights are generally only enforceable in that jurisdiction, a quality which is sometimes known as "territoriality". However, there is a range of international trademark laws and systems which facilitate the protection of trademarks in more than one jurisdiction.

Search
In the United States, the USPTO maintains a database of registered trademarks.  The database is open to the public and is searchable via the Trademark Electronic Search System (TESS). As trademarks are governed by federal law, state law, and common law, a thorough search as to the availability of a mark and its image components is very important. Marks consisting of a design are assigned "design search codes" by the USPTO for different elements of the design to enable the public and USPTO employees to search the database for similar design marks  . In the United States obtaining a trademark search and subsequent registration will protect the mark owner from being required to potentially pay damages in a trademark infringement case, as it demonstrates the trademark administrative legal issuance staff along with the registrant performed thorough due diligence searches for conflicting marks, and therefore the mark owner had good foresight by having a priority registration, and thus is likely using their mark IP in good faith.

The USPTO internally captures more information about trademarks than they publicly disclose on their official search website, such as the complete contents of every logo trademark filing. In addition intelligence service agencies likely collect owner/applicant office and computer systems information, and apply motoring techniques to their systems for forensics and security purposes. Initial trademark submissions are a way to gather early intelligence informations. 

Trademarks may also be searched on third-party databases such as LexisNexis, Dialog, CompuMark, and Corsearch.

Within the European Union, searches have to be conducted taking into account both EU trademarks as well as national trademarks.

Classification systems exist to help in searching for marks.  One example is the "International Classification of the Figurative Elements of Marks", better known as the Vienna Classification.

Ability to register 
In most systems, a trademark can be registered if it can distinguish the goods or services of a party, will not confuse consumers about the relationship between one party and another, and will not otherwise deceive consumers concerning the qualities.

Distinctive character

A trademark may be eligible for registration, or registerable, if it performs the essential trademark function and has a distinctive character. Registerability can be understood as a continuum, where marks are categorized as "generic", "descriptive", "suggestive", "arbitrary", or "fanciful", by order of increasing strength, as is the case in the United States. "Fanciful" refers to marks whose sole purpose is to function as trademarks. Marks that fall under the last three categories are deemed "inherently distinctive" and thus protectable ab initio. "Descriptive" marks must acquire distinctiveness through secondary meaning – consumers have come to recognize the mark as a source indicator – to be protectable. "Generic" terms are used to refer to the product or service itself and cannot be used as trademarks. (See the KitKat v. Cadbury case.)

Maintaining rights
Trademarks rights must be maintained through actual lawful use of the trademark. These rights will cease if a mark is not actively used for a period of time, normally five years in most jurisdictions. In the case of trademark registration, failure to actively use the mark in the lawful course of trade, or to enforce the registration in the event of infringement, may also expose the registration itself to become liable for an application for the removal from the register after a certain period of time on the grounds of "non-use".

A trademark owner doesn't need to take enforcement action against all infringement if it can be shown that the owner perceived the infringement to be minor and inconsequential. This is designed to prevent owners from continually being tied up in litigation for fear of cancellation.

An owner can at any time commence an action for infringement against a third party as long as it had not previously notified the third party of its discontent following third party use and then failed to take action within a reasonable period of time (called acquiescence). The owner can always reserve the right to take legal action until a court decides that the third party had gained notoriety of which the owner "must" have been aware. It will be for the third party to prove their use of the mark is substantial as it is the onus of a company using a mark to check they are not infringing previously registered rights. In the US, owing to the overwhelming number of unregistered rights, trademark applicants are advised to perform searches not just of the trademark register but of local business directories and relevant trade press. Specialized search companies perform such tasks before application.

All jurisdictions with a mature trademark registration system provide a mechanism for removal in the event of such non-use, which is usually a period of either three or five years. The intention to use a trademark can be proven by a wide range of acts as shown in the "Woolly Bully" and Aston v Harlee cases.

In the U.S., failure to use a trademark for this period of time will result in abandonment of the mark, whereby any party may use the mark. An abandoned mark is not irrevocably in the public domain, but may instead be re-registered by any party which has re-established exclusive and active use, and must be associated or linked with the original mark owner. A mark is registered in conjunction with a description of a specific type of goods, and if the party uses the mark but in conjunction with a different type of goods, the mark may still be considered abandoned, as was the case in Lens.com, Inc. v. 1-800 Contacts, Inc. If a court rules that a trademark has become  "generic" through common use (such that the mark no longer performs the essential trademark function and the average consumer no longer considers that exclusive rights attach to it), the corresponding registration may also be ruled invalid.

Unlike other forms of intellectual property (e.g., patents and copyrights) a registered trademark can, theoretically, last forever. So long as a trademark's use is continuous a trademark holder may keep the mark registered with the U.S. Patent and Trademark Office by filing Section 8 Affidavit(s) of Continuous Use as well as Section 9 Applications for renewal, as required, and paying the fees associated with them.

Incontestable status 
Specifically, once registered with the U.S. Patent and Trademark Office the owner of a trademark is required to file a Section 8 Affidavit of Continuous Use to maintain the registration between the 5th and 6th year anniversaries of the registration of the mark or during the 6-month grace period following the 6th anniversary of the registration. During this period, a trademark owner may concurrently opt to file a Section 15, Declaration of Incontestability. A mark declared incontestable is immune from future challenge, except in instances where the mark becomes generic, the mark is abandoned, or if the registration was acquired fraudulently. Note, if the Section 8 Affidavit is filed during the 6-month grace period additional fees to file the Affidavit with the U.S. Patent and Trademark Office will apply.

In addition to the requirements above, U.S. trademark registrations are also required to be renewed on or about every 10th anniversary of the registration of the trademark. The procedure for 10-year renewals is somewhat different from that for the 5th–6th year renewal. In brief, registrants are required to file both a Section 8 Affidavit of Continuous Use as well as a Section 9 Application for Renewal every ten years to maintain their registration.

Enforcing rights

The extent to which a trademark owner may prevent unauthorized use of trademarks that are the same as or similar to its trademark depends on various factors such as whether its trademark is registered, the similarity of the trademarks involved, the similarity of the products or services involved, and whether the owner's trademark is well known or, under U.S. law relating to trademark dilution, famous.

If a trademark has not been registered, some jurisdictions (especially Common Law countries) offer protection for the business reputation or goodwill which attaches to unregistered trademarks through the tort of passing off. Passing off may provide a remedy in a scenario where a business has been trading under an unregistered trademark for many years, and a rival business starts using the same or a similar mark.

If a trademark has been registered, then it is much easier for the trademark owner to demonstrate its trademark rights and to enforce these rights through an infringement action. Unauthorized use of a registered trademark need not be intentional for infringement to occur, although damages in an infringement lawsuit will generally be greater if there was an intention to deceive.

For trademarks that are considered to be well known, infringing use may occur where the use occurs about products or services which are not the same as or similar to the products or services about which the owner's mark is registered.
A growing area of law relating to the enforcement of trademark rights is secondary liability, which allows for the imputation of liability to one who has not acted directly to infringe a trademark but whose legal responsibility may arise under the doctrines of either contributory or vicarious liability.

Limits and defenses to claims of infringement
Trademark is subject to various defenses, such as abandonment, limitations on geographic scope, and fair use. In the United States, the fair use defense protects many of the interests in free expression related to those protected by the First Amendment.

Fair use may be asserted on two grounds, either that the alleged infringer is using the mark to describe accurately an aspect of its products, or that the alleged infringer is using the mark to identify the mark owner.  One of the most visible proofs that trademarks provide a limited right in the U.S. comes from the comparative advertising that is seen throughout U.S. media.

An example of the first type is that although Maytag owns the trademark "Whisper Quiet" for its dishwashers, makers of other products may describe their goods as being "whisper quiet" so long as these products do not fall under the same category of goods the trademark is protected under.

An example of the second type is that Audi can run advertisements saying that a trade publication has rated an Audi model higher than a BMW model since they are only using "BMW" to identify the competitor. In a related sense, an auto mechanic can truthfully advertise that he services Volkswagens, and a former Playboy Playmate of the Year can identify herself as such on her website.

Wrongful or groundless threats of infringement
Various jurisdictions have laws that are designed to prevent trademark owners from making wrongful threats of a trademark infringement action against other parties.  These laws are intended to prevent large or powerful companies from intimidating or harassing smaller companies.

Where one party makes a threat to sue another for trademark infringement, but does not have a genuine basis or intention to carry out that threat, or does not carry out the threat at all within a certain period, the threat may itself become a basis for legal action. In this situation, the party receiving such a threat may seek from the Court a declaratory judgment; also known as a declaratory ruling.

Other aspects

Public policy
Trademark law is designed to fulfill the public policy objective of consumer protection, by preventing the public from being misled as to the origin or quality of a product or service. By identifying the commercial source of products and services, trademarks facilitate the identification of products and services which meet the expectations of consumers as to the quality and other characteristics.

Trademarks may also serve as an incentive for manufacturers, providers, or suppliers to consistently provide quality products or services to maintain their business reputation. Furthermore, if a trademark owner does not maintain quality control and adequate supervision about the manufacture and provision of products or services supplied by a licensee, such "naked licensing" will eventually adversely affect the owner's rights in the trademark. For US law see, ex. Eva's Bridal Ltd. v. Halanick Enterprises, Inc. 639 F.3d 788 (7th Cor. 2011). This proposition has, however, been watered down by the judgment of the House of Lords in the case of Scandecor Development AB v. Scandecor Marketing AB et al. [2001] UKHL 21; wherein it has been held that the mere fact that a bare license (the equivalent of the United States concept of a naked license) has been granted did not automatically mean that a trademark was liable to mislead.

By the same token, trademark holders must be cautious in the sale of their mark for similar reasons as apply to licensing.  When assigning an interest in a trademark, if the associated product or service is not transferred with it, then this may be an "assignment-in-gross" and could lead to a loss of rights in the trademark. It is still possible to make significant changes to the underlying goods or services during a sale without jeopardizing the trademark, but companies will often contract with the sellers to help transition the mark and goods or services to the new owners to ensure continuity of the trademark.

Comparison with patents, designs and copyright

While trademark law seeks to protect indications of the commercial source of products or services, patent law generally seeks to protect new and useful inventions, and registered designs law generally seeks to protect the look or appearance of a manufactured article. Trademarks, patents, and designs collectively form a subset of intellectual property known as industrial property because they are often created and used in an industrial or commercial context.

By comparison, copyright law generally seeks to protect original literary, artistic, and other creative works. Continued active use and re-registration can make a trademark perpetual, whereas copyright usually lasts for the duration of the author's lifespan plus 70 years for works by individuals, and some limited time after creation for works by bodies corporate. This can lead to confusion in cases where a work passes into the public domain but the character in question remains a registered trademark.

Although intellectual property laws such as these are theoretically distinct, more than one type may afford protection to the same article. For example, the particular design of a bottle may qualify for copyright protection as a non-utilitarian [sculpture], or trademark protection based on its shape, or the 'trade dress' appearance of the bottle as a whole may be protectable. Titles and character names from books or movies may also be protectable as trademarks while the works from which they are drawn may qualify for copyright protection as a whole. Trademark protection does not apply to utilitarian features of a product such as the plastic interlocking studs on Lego bricks.

Drawing these distinctions is necessary, but often challenging for the courts and lawyers, especially in jurisdictions where patents and copyrights pass into the public domain, depending on the jurisdiction. Unlike patents and copyrights, which in theory are granted for one-off fixed terms, trademarks remain valid as long as the owner actively uses and defends them and maintains their registrations with the competent authorities. This often involves the payment of a periodic renewal fee.

As a trademark must be used to maintain rights about that mark, a trademark can be 'abandoned' or its registration can be canceled or revoked if the mark is not continuously used. By comparison, patents and copyrights cannot be 'abandoned' and a patent holder or copyright owner can generally enforce their rights without taking any particular action to maintain the patent or copyright. Additionally, patent holders and copyright owners may not necessarily need to actively police their rights. However, a failure to bring a timely infringement suit or action against a known infringer may give the defendant a defense of implied consent or estoppel when the suit is finally brought.

Like patents and copyrights, trademarks can be bought, sold, and transferred from one company or another. Unlike patents and copyrights, trademarks may not remain intact through this process. Where trademarks have been acquired for marketing generic (non-distinctive) products, courts have refused to enforce them.

In 1923, the author Edgar Rice Burroughs registered his fictitious character Tarzan as a trademark; even after the copyright to the Tarzan story expired, his company used ownership of the trademarks relating to the character (which unlike copyrights, do not have a limited length) to control the production of media using its imagery and license the character for use in other works (such as adaptations). This practice is a precursor to the modern concept of a media franchise.

Dilution 

A trademark is diluted when the use of similar or identical trademarks in other non-competing markets means that the trademark in and of itself will lose its capacity to signify a single source.  In other words, unlike ordinary trademark law, dilution protection extends to trademark uses that do not confuse consumers regarding who has made a product. Instead, dilution protection law aims to protect sufficiently strong trademarks from losing their singular association in the public mind with a particular product, perhaps imagined if the trademark were to be encountered independently of any product (e.g., just the word Pepsi spoken, or on a billboard).
Under trademark law, dilution occurs either when unauthorized use of a mark "blurs" the "distinctive nature of the mark" or "tarnishes it." Likelihood of confusion is not required. 15 U.S.C §§ 1127, 1125(c).

Sale, transfer and licensing
In various jurisdictions, a trademark may be sold with or without the underlying goodwill which subsists in the business associated with the mark. However, this is not the case in the United States, where the courts have held that this would "be a fraud upon the public". In the U.S., trademark registration can therefore only be sold and assigned if accompanied by the sale of an underlying asset. Examples of assets whose sale would ordinarily support the assignment of a mark include the sale of the machinery used to produce the goods that bear the mark or the sale of the corporation (or subsidiary) that produces the trademarked goods.

Licensing
Licensing means the trademark owner (the licensor) grants a permit to a third party (the licensee) to commercially use the trademark legally. It is a contract between the two, containing the scope of content and policy. The essential provisions to a trademark license identify the trademark owner and the licensee, in addition to the policy and the goods or services agreed to be licensed.

Most jurisdictions provide for the use of trademarks to be licensed to third parties. The licensor must monitor the quality of the goods being produced by the licensee to avoid the risk of the trademark being deemed abandoned by the courts. A trademark license should therefore include appropriate provisions dealing with quality control, whereby the licensee provides warranties as to the quality and the licensor has rights to inspection and monitoring.

Domain names
The advent of the domain name system has led to attempts by trademark holders to enforce their rights over domain names that are similar or identical to their existing trademarks, particularly by seeking control over the domain names at issue. As with dilution protection, enforcing trademark rights over domain name owners involves protecting a trademark outside the obvious context of its consumer market, because domain names are global and not limited by goods or service.

This conflict is easily resolved when the domain name owner actually uses the domain to compete with the trademark owner. Cybersquatting, however, does not involve competition. Instead, an unlicensed user registers a domain name identical to a trademark and offers to sell the domain to the trademark owner. Typosquatters—those registering common misspellings of trademarks as domain names—have also been targeted successfully in trademark infringement suits.  "Gripe sites", on the other hand, tend to be protected as free speech, and are therefore more difficult to attack as trademark infringement.

This clash of the new technology with preexisting trademark rights resulted in several high-profile decisions as the courts of many countries tried to coherently address the issue (and not always successfully) within the framework of existing trademark law.  As the website itself was not the product being purchased, there was no actual consumer confusion, and so initial interest confusion was a concept applied instead. Initial interest confusion refers to customer confusion that creates an initial interest in a competitor's "product" (in the online context, another party's website).  Even though initial interest confusion is dispelled by the time any actual sales occur, it allows a trademark infringer to capitalize on the goodwill associated with the original mark.

Several cases have wrestled with the concept of initial interest confusion. In Brookfield Communications, Inc. v. West Coast Entertainment Corp. the court found initial interest confusion could occur when a competitor's trademarked terms were used in the HTML metatags of a website, resulting in that site appearing in the search results when a user searches on the trademarked term. In Playboy v. Netscape, the court found initial interest confusion when users typed in Playboy's trademarks into a search engine, resulting in the display of search results alongside unlabeled banner ads, triggered by keywords that included Playboy's marks, that would take users to Playboy's competitors. Though users might ultimately realize upon clicking on the banner ads that they were not Playboy-affiliated, the court found that the competitor advertisers could have gained customers by appropriating Playboy's goodwill since users may be perfectly happy to browse the competitor's site instead of returning to the search results to find the Playboy sites.

In Lamparello v. Falwell, however, the court clarified that a finding of initial interest confusion is contingent on financial profit from said confusion, such that, if a domain name confusingly similar to a registered trademark is used for a non-trademark related website, the site owner will not be found to have infringed where they do not seek to capitalize on the mark's goodwill for their own commercial enterprises.

Also, courts have upheld the rights of trademark owners about the commercial use of domain names, even in cases where goods sold there legitimately bear the mark. In the landmark decision Creative Gifts, Inc. v. UFO, 235 F.3d 540 (10th Cor. 2000) (New Mexico), defendants had registered the domain name "Levitron.com" to sell goods bearing the trademark "Levitron" under an at-will license from the trademark owner. The 10th Circuit affirmed the rights of the trademark owner about the said domain name, despite arguments of promissory estoppel.

Most courts particularly frowned on cybersquatting and found that it was itself a sufficiently commercial use (i.e., "trafficking" in trademarks) to reach into the area of trademark infringement.  Most jurisdictions have since amended their trademark laws to address domain names specifically and to provide explicit remedies against cybersquatters.

In the US, the legal situation was clarified by the Anticybersquatting Consumer Protection Act, an amendment to the Lanham Act, which explicitly prohibited cybersquatting. It defines cybersquatting as "(occurring) when a person other than the trademark holder registers the domain name of a well-known trademark and then attempts to profit from this by either ransoming the domain name back to the trademark holder or using the domain name to divert business from the trademark holder to the domain name holder". The provision states that "[a] person shall be liable in a civil action by the owner of the mark ... if, without regard to the goods or services of the person, that person (i) had a bad faith intent to profit from the mark ...; and registers, traffics in, or uses domain name [that is confusingly similar to another's a mark or dilutes another's marked]".

This international legal change has also led to the creation of ICANN Uniform Domain-Name Dispute-Resolution Policy (UDRP) and other dispute policies for specific countries (such as Nominet UK's DRS) which attempt to streamline the process of resolving who should own a domain name (without dealing with other infringement issues such as damages).  This is particularly desirable to trademark owners when the domain name registrant may be in another country or even anonymous.

Registrants of domain names also sometimes wish to register the domain names themselves (e.g., "XYZ.COM") as trademarks for perceived advantages, such as an extra bulwark against their domain being hijacked, and to avail themselves of such remedies as confusion or passing off against other domain holders with confusingly similar or intentionally misspelled domain names.

As with other trademarks, the domain name will not be subject to trademark registration unless the proposed mark is actually used to identify the registrant's goods or services to the public, rather than simply being the location on the Internet where the applicant's web site appears. Amazon is a prime example of a protected trademark for a domain name central to the public's identification of the company and its products.

Terms that are not protectable by themselves, such as a generic term or a merely descriptive term that has not acquired secondary meaning, may become registerable when a Top-Level Domain Name (e.g. dot-COM) is appended to it. An example of such a domain name ineligible for trademark or service mark protection as a generic term, but which currently has a registered U.S. service mark, is "HEARSAY.COM".

Among trademark practitioners there remains a great deal of debate around trademark protection under ICANN's proposed generic top-level domain name space expansion. World Trademark Review has been reporting on the at times fiery discussion between trademark owners and domainers.

Security
Trademark owners and applications enjoy many protections. The IPR (Intellectual Property Rights) Center for example has the message of "protection is our trademark" and is one example of an office that will enforce and protect the marks when needed.

International law
Although there are systems that facilitate the filing, registration, or enforcement of trademark rights in more than one jurisdiction on a regional or global basis, it is currently not possible to file and obtain a single trademark registration that will automatically apply around the world. Like any national law, trademark laws apply only in their applicable country or jurisdiction, a quality which is sometimes known as "territoriality".

Territorial application
The inherent limitations of the territorial application of trademark laws have been mitigated by various intellectual property treaties, foremost amongst which is the WTO Agreement on Trade-Related Aspects of Intellectual Property Rights (TRIPS). TRIPS establishes legal compatibility between member jurisdictions by requiring the harmonization of applicable laws. For example, Article 15(1) of TRIPS defines "sign" which is used as or forms part of the definition of "trademark" in the trademark legislation of many jurisdictions around the world.

Madrid system

The major international system for facilitating the registration of trademarks in multiple jurisdictions is commonly known as the "Madrid system ". Madrid provides a centrally administered system for securing trademark registrations in member jurisdictions by extending the protection of an "international registration" obtained through the World Intellectual Property Organization. This international registration is in turn based upon an application or registration obtained by a trademark applicant in its home jurisdiction.

The primary advantage of the Madrid system is that it allows a trademark owner to obtain trademark protection in many jurisdictions by filing one application in one jurisdiction with one set of fees, and make any changes (e.g. changes of name or address), and renew registration across all applicable jurisdictions through a single administrative process. Furthermore, the "coverage" of the international registration may be extended to additional member jurisdictions at any time.

Trademark Law Treaty
The Trademark Law Treaty establishes a system under which member jurisdictions agree to standardize procedural aspects of the trademark registration process. It is not necessarily respective of rules within individual countries.

Community Trademark system

The EU Trade Mark (EUTM) system (formerly the Community Trademark system) is the trademark system which applies in the European Union, whereby registration of a trademark with the European Union Intellectual Property Office (EUIPO, formerly Office for Harmonization in the Internal Market (Trade Marks and Designs)), leads to a registration which is effective throughout the EU as a whole. The EUTM system is therefore said to be unitary in character, in that a EUTM registration applies indivisibly across all European Union member states. However, the CTM system did not replace the national trademark registration systems; the CTM system and the national systems continue to operate in parallel to each other (see also European Union trade mark law).

Persons residing outside the EU must have a professional representative to the procedures before EUIPO, while representation is recommended for EU residents.

One of the tasks of a EUTM owner is the monitoring of the later applications whether any of those is similar to his/her earlier trademark. Monitoring is not easy and usually requires professional expertise. To conduct a monitoring there is the so-called Trademark Watching service where it can be checked if someone tries to get registered marks that are similar to the existing marks.

Oppositions should be filed on the standard opposition form in any official language of the European Union, however, the substantive part of the opposition (e.g. the argumentations) can be submitted only in the language of the opposed application, that is one of the working languages of the EUIPO, e.g. English, Spanish, German.

Well-known status
Well-known trademark status is commonly granted to famous international trade marks in less-developed legal jurisdictions.

Under Article 6 bis of the Paris Convention, countries are empowered to grant this status to marks that the relevant authority considers are 'well known'. In addition to the standard grounds for trademark infringement (same/similar mark applied same/similar goods or services, and a likelihood of confusion), if the mark is deemed well known it is an infringement to apply the same or a similar mark to dissimilar goods/services where there is confusion, including where it takes unfair advantage of the well-known mark or causing detriment to it.

A well-known trademark does not have to be registered in the jurisdiction to bring a trademark infringement action (equivalent to bringing a passing off claim without having to show goodwill and having a lesser burden of proof).

As per the Trademark Rules 2017, India, an applicant needs to substantiate his claim that his trademark is having the "well-known" status. He needs to furnish the documents in support of evidence of his rights & claims, namely use of trademark, any application for trademark, and annual sales turnover, and so on.

Protection of well-known marks
Many countries protect unregistered well-known marks following their international obligations under the Paris Convention for the Protection of Industrial Property and the Agreement on Trade-Related Aspects of Intellectual Property Rights (the TRIPS Agreement). Consequently, not only big companies but also SMEs may have a good chance of establishing enough goodwill with customers so that their marks may be recognized as well-known marks and acquire protection without registration. It is, nevertheless, advisable to seek registration, taking into account that many countries provide for extended protection of registered well-known marks against dilution (Art. 16.3 TRIPS), i.e., the reputation of the mark being weakened by the unauthorized use of that mark by others.

Several trademark laws merely implement obligations under Article 16.3 of the TRIPS Agreement and protect well-known registered trademarks only under the following conditions: 1- that the goods and services for which the other mark is used or is seeking protection are not identical with or similar to the goods for which the well-known mark acquired its reputation 2- that the use of the other mark would indicate a connection between these goods and the owner of the well-known mark, and 3 – that their interests are likely to be damaged by such use.

References

External links

   "Quick Facts" by the Intellectual Property Office (United Kingdom)
 Trademark Fact Sheets by the International Trademark Association
 Trade Marks: The information brochure on trademark protection by the German Patent and Trade Mark Office (GPTO)
 Patent and Trademark Information from UCB Libraries GovPubs
 Trademark info on WIPO website

 
Brand management
Brands
Intellectual property law
Product management
Intangible assets